The Campaign of Tlemcen or Tlemcen campaign was a military operation led by the Saadians of Mohammed ash-Sheikh against Tlemcen in 1557, then under the domination of the Regency of Algiers, a vassal state of the Ottoman Empire. Mohammed ash-Sheikh, who wanted to conquer Algeria, occupied the city but failed to seize the Mechouar Palace which was defended by a garrison of 500 men under the command of Caid Saffa.

Background 
In 1550, Mohammed ash-Sheikh launched a great offensive against the Algerian presence in north-west Algeria. The Moroccans seized Tlemcen on June 9, 1550, but failed before Mostaganem and were then defeated by the Banu Amir tribe, allies of the Spaniards in Oran. The Ottomans retaliated in 1551, and launched a counter-attack with their Berber allies from the Kingdom of Ait Abbas and the pro-Ottoman Zayyanids. Defeated by Hassan Pasha's Turkish contingents, the Moroccan army abandons Tlemcen.

Salah Raïs gathers in Tlemcen an army of Turkish harquebusiers and Berber soldiers from the kingdom of Kuku. They launch a campaign against Fez with the aim of enthroning Ali Abu Hassun, a Watassid suitor in exile. After heavy fighting near Fez, Mohammed ash-Sheikh is defeated and forced to abandon the city. Troops of the regency of Algiers entered the city on January 9, 1554. Ali Abu Hassun hastened to remove some of the Turks who were guilty of several acts of violence against the population, in exchange for a large sum of money that he had promised them, as well as the Peñón de Vélez de la Gomera base.

Mohammed ash-Sheikh reorganized his troops in the south and defeated Ali Abu Hassun in the battle of Tadla. This victory allowed Mohammed ash-Sheikh to re-seize the city of Fez on September 13, 1554, and to ascend the throne and establish definitively the Saadian dynasty in Morocco.

Battle 
The Saadian sultan wants to take advantage of the disorder that reigns in the government of Algiers since the return of Hassan Corso. Moulay Mohammed El Mehdi, son of the Saadian sultan, marched on Tlemcen at the head of a garrison of 400 men. The town was defended by a small garrison of the Algerian army commanded by the caïd Çafa. During the attack, the Algerian garrison entrenched itself in the citadel of the city and resisted all assaults while waiting for reinforcements from Algiers.

As soon as he returned to Algiers, the Algerian sultan, Hasan Pacha assembled a powerful army. Alerted to this offensive, he marched to the aid of Tlemcen with its twenty-two thousand men. On hearing of his arrival, the frightened Moroccans crossed the border again, hotly pursued by the Algerian army which reached them under the walls of Fez.

A counter-battle under the walls of Fez took place. The city was defended by four thousand musketeers, thirty thousand horsemen and ten thousand infantrymen. This Algerian counter-attack, described as stubborn, caused many losses on both the Moroccan and Algerian sides. Hassan Pasha decided to return with his army to Tlemcen after being warned of a possible Spanish attack. For the bey of Algiers, the Saadians were not a problem as long as they did not cross the Moulouya river, which served as the border between Algeria and Morocco at the time.

Aftermath 
The Moroccan army ends its campaign when it learns that a berber revolt has broken out in the Moroccan Atlas Mountains. Mohamed el Mehdi withdrew, leaving Caïd Mansour in place with his troops. Hassan, son of Hayreddin Barbarossa, who had returned at the head of the regency of Algiers, defeated the Moroccans and launched an assassin, a certain Salah Kahia, to take revenge on Sultan Mohamed ash-sheikh and his attempted alliance with the Spaniards. Another failed Saadi expedition against Tlemcen occurred in 1560.

References 

16th century in Algeria
16th century in Morocco
Tlemcen
Tlemcen
Tlemcen
Tlemcen
1557 in Africa